Heather Avis McPherson (28 May 1942 – 10 January 2017) was a feminist poet, publisher and editor who played a key role in supporting women artists and writers in New Zealand. In 1976 she founded the Spiral Collective group and Spiral, a women's arts and literary journal that later published monographs. Her poetry book A Figurehead: A Face (1982) was the first book of poetry published in New Zealand by an openly lesbian woman. She published three further collections during her lifetime, and an additional collection was published posthumously by fellow Spiral members.

Career 
Born in Tauranga, McPherson initially trained as a primary school teacher in the early 1960s. She subsequently studied at the University of Canterbury, where she earned a Bachelor of Arts in 1971, and at the University of Auckland. Her poetry first appeared in print in 1963, with her early work being published in New Zealand journals like Landfall.

Her influential literary and visual arts activism was inspired by an all-male poets' evening at the 1973 Christchurch Festival, where she observed "twenty young men getting up on the stage one after another". In later years, she said that in the early 1970s she approached Leo Bensemann, then the editor of Landfall, to see if he would be willing to publish a collection of her works; when she mentioned she had become a feminist, he responded that Rita Angus had also become a feminist "but it didn't do her any good either". It was not long after, in 1974, that she founded one of New Zealand's first women's artist collectives, the Women Artists Group in Christchurch, with other members including Paulette Barr, Allie Eagle (also known as Alison Mitchell) and Kathryn Algie. This group co-founded the first New Zealand women's art journal, Spiral and the women artist's collective Spiral.

Spiral provided a forum for female artists and writers to publish their work, during a time in which female artists struggled to be recognised in New Zealand. McPherson herself said, "I worked with the material we received–that it didn't reflect our own reality didn't bother me too much, it was the idea of women working together positively, that was the aim, and the amalgam of arts – photographers as well as poets, writers, painters etc." The journal was first published in 1976 through the efforts of the Spiral Collective, which was to become a floating imprint used by different feminist groups. The first four issues were published by McPherson and the Christchurch collective (1976–79), issue five was published by a Wellington collective, issue six by a Tauranga collective, and issue seven by a national collective. A letter published in an early issue suggested that work should be accepted on merit rather than limited to work by women only; in response, McPherson said she supported positive discrimination for women and noted the barriers faced by women to publication in most magazines.

Spiral also became an imprint used by different feminist groups to publish other books by New Zealand women, including McPherson's debut poetry collection, A Figurehead: A Face (Spiral, 1982), which was the first New Zealand poetry collection by an out lesbian. In her introduction to the collection McPherson noted that since the 1970s she had sought "to make a new start, to clear out the 'patriarchy in the head'", and on other hand to "redefine such emotionally charged concepts as 'woman' and 'lesbian' with their pejorative accretions". Other works published by Spiral included Keri Hulme's Booker Prize-winning novel The Bone People (1984), The House of the Talking Cat by J C Sturm (Jacquie Baxter, 1983), and Drawing Together by Janet Charman, Marina Bachmann and Sue Fitchett (1985). Artists and writers who were associated with the Women Artists Group initiatives and the Spiral Collectives included Joanna Margaret Paul, Marian Evans, Allie Eagle, Bridie Lonie, and Anna Keir, all prominent figures in the women's art movement in New Zealand.

In 1980, McPherson was involved in the opening show at the Women's Gallery in Wellington, where she worked as a co-ordinator. Her poem, Have You Heard of Artemisia? was painted on the 1981 Matariki Mural on the outside wall of the gallery on Harris Street. In 1986, she attended the second International Feminist Book Fair in Oslo with other Spiral members. She was a supporter of and advisor to the Spiral video project Getting Free (1997 to 2009), led by Marian Evans and Bridie Lonie.

After A Figurehead: A Face, McPherson published three further collections of poetry in her lifetime. Her poetry was described by Aorewa McLeod in The Oxford Companion to New Zealand Literature as "strongly feminist, combining myth with the implications of being a woman and a lesbian in New Zealand", and featuring "a distinctive witty intelligence together with a sensitive and lyrical voice".

Personal life and legacy
McPherson was a single mother and grandmother, and in her early career worked various "survival jobs" such as fruit picking and school bus driving in order to support her family. In her obituary, Michael O'Leary said that family "was also a big part of her life as well as writing and she was very involved with her grandchildren". She identified as a lesbian feminist and as a part of the women's liberation movement.

She died in Hamilton on 10 January 2017. After her death, in early 2018, a collective of Spiral members Janet Charman, Lynne Ciochetto and Marian Evans published a collection of poetry by McPherson, called This Joyous, Chaotic Place: Garden Poems, as part of an exhibition called "This Joyous, Chaotic Place: He Waiata Tangi-ā-Tahu" at Mokopōpaki, an Auckland dealer gallery with Māori values at its centre. The event included the screening of an interview of McPherson in 1980, and was a project that formed part of the celebrations in New Zealand marking 125 years since women's suffrage. The collection featured what McPherson called her "garden poems", inspired by her visits to the graveside of early New Zealand poet Ursula Bethell.

Works

Poetry books   
Source: National Library of NZ
 i do not cede, edited and with an introduction by Emer Lyons (eBook), Spiral, Wellington, 2022 
 This Joyous Chaotic Place: Garden Poems, Spiral, Wellington, 2018
 Travel and Other Compulsions, Earl of Seacliff Art Workshop, Paekakariki, 2004 
 Other World Relations, Old Bags, Wellington, 1991 
 The Third Myth, Tauranga Moana Press, Tauranga, 1986 
 A Figurehead: a Face, Spiral, Wellington, 1982

Exhibition
This Joyous, Chaotic Place: He Waiata Tangi-ā-Tahu Mokopōpaki, 2018

Anthologies  
Sources: National Library of NZ and Aotearoa Poetry Sound Archive
 This Joyous, Chaotic Place: He Waiata Tangi-āTahu (with texts from Allie Eagle, Dr P (Cushla Parekowhai), Heather McPherson, Margery Blackman, M (Marian Evans), Tiffany Thornley), Mokopōpaki & Spiral, 2019
 Manifesto Aotearoa ed. Philip Temple & Emma Neale, Otago University Press, Dunedin, 2017
 Live Lines IV ed. Miriam Barr, Rachael Naomi Heimann, Penny Sommervaile, Jeremy Roberts, Poetry Live, Auckland, 2011
Remember us: women who love women, from Sappho to liberation ed. Miriam Saphira, Heather McPherson & Fran Marno, Charlotte Museum Trust, New Zealand, 2008
Big Smoke: New Zealand Poems 1960–75 ed. Michele Leggott Murray Edmond, Alan Brunton, Auckland University Press, Auckland 2000
Eat These Sweet Words, ed. Sue Fitchett, Marewa Glover, Cary McDermott & Rhona Vickoce, Giant Publishing Press, Christchurch 1999
Car Maintenance, Explosives and Love, ed. Susan Hawthorne, Cathy Dunsford & Susan Sayer, Spinifex, Nth. Melb, 1997
Spiral 7: a collection of lesbian art and writing from Aotearoa/New Zealand, ed. Heather McPherson, Julie King, Marian Evans, Pam Gerrish Nunn, Daphne Brasell Associates Press, Wellington, 1992
Lavender Annual, ed. Miriam Saphira, Papers Inc., 1989
Kiwi and Emu: An Anthology of Contemporary Poetry by Australian and New Zealand Women, ed. Barbara Petrie, Butterfly, 1989
The Penguin Book of Contemporary New Zealand Poetry, ed. Miriama Evans, Harvey McQueen and Ian Wedde, 1989
A Women's Picture Book: 25 Women Artists of Aotearoa New Zealand ed. Marian Evans, Bridie Lonie, Tilly Lloyd, Government Print, Wellington, 1988
Yellow Pencils: Contemporary Poetry by New Zealand Women, chosen by Lydia Wevers, OUP, 1988
The New Poets of the ‘80s, ed. Murray Edmond & Mary Paul, Allen & Unwin, 1987
The Penguin Book of New Zealand Verse, ed. Ian Wedde and Harvey McQueen, 1985.
The Turning Face, Twelve Writers from Tauranga Moana ed. Robert de Roo, Tauranga Moana Press, 1984
Spiral 4 ed. Spiral Collective: Ruth Lawley, Heather McPherson, Wendy Prestney, Tiffany Thornily, Chris Smith, Gladys Gurney, Spiral, Christchurch, 1979
Spiral 3 ed. Spiral Collective: Patsy Keene, Anna Keir, Ruth Lawley, Heather McPherson, Wendy Prestney, Tiffany Thornley, Spiral, Christchurch, 1978
Spiral 2 ed. Spiral Collective: Kath Algie, Paulette Barr, Heather McPherson, Alison Mitchell, Spiral, Christchurch, 1977
Private Gardens: An Anthology of New Zealand Women Poets, ed. Riemke Ensing, Caveman, 1977
Spiral 1 ed. Heather McPherson, Spiral, Christchurch, 1976
Arts Festival Year Book 1969, New Zealand Universities, ed. Bill Manhire & John Dickson, Dunedin
Kiwi 1963, ed. Tyme Curnow & Terry Snow, Auckland University Press

References 

New Zealand feminists
New Zealand women poets
People from Tauranga
1942 births
2017 deaths
University of Auckland alumni
University of Canterbury alumni
New Zealand LGBT poets
New Zealand editors
New Zealand women editors
20th-century New Zealand poets
20th-century New Zealand women writers
21st-century New Zealand poets
21st-century New Zealand writers